Milenko Bajić (born 20 August 1944 in Resanovci near Bosansko Grahovo, FPR Yugoslavia - died 24 April 2009 in Sarajevo, Bosnia and Herzegovina) was a former Bosnian-Herzegovinian and Yugoslav professional footballer and manager.

Club career
He played for FK Sarajevo and Sion. As a member of the FK Sarajevo coaching staff, he went on to win the club's second Yugoslav League title in 1985.

International career
Bajić made his debut for Yugoslavia in an April 1970 friendly match against Austria, which remained his sole international appearance.

References

External links

1944 births
2009 deaths
People from Bosansko Grahovo
Association football defenders
Yugoslav footballers
Yugoslavia international footballers
FK Sarajevo players
FC Sion players
Yugoslav First League players
Swiss Super League players
Yugoslav expatriate footballers
Expatriate footballers in Switzerland
Yugoslav expatriate sportspeople in Switzerland